Andrea Ciolli (born 20 October 1989) is an Italian professional footballer who plays as a centre back for  club Grosseto.

Club career
In 2015, he signed for Serie D club Grosseto.

In August 2017, Ciolli retired momentally as a player because cardiac problems.

After played a relegation on Eccellenza with the club, Ciolli returned to Serie C for the 2020–21 season. In 2020, he was named captain of the team.

International career
Ciolli played a match for Italy U16 on 25 April 2005 against Slovakia.

References

External links
 
 

1989 births
Living people
People from Grosseto
Footballers from Tuscany
Italian footballers
Association football defenders
Serie C players
Lega Pro Seconda Divisione players
Serie D players
Eccellenza players
U.S. Alessandria Calcio 1912 players
F.C. Pro Vercelli 1892 players
Celano F.C. Marsica players
Asti Calcio F.C. players
U.S. Grosseto 1912 players
Italy youth international footballers
Sportspeople from the Province of Grosseto